The Southern Cross Hotel was a hotel in Melbourne, Australia. It was opened by the Prime Minister, Robert Menzies, on 24 August 1962 as Australia's first modern 'International' hotel, heralding the arrival of American-style glamour, the jet-set and international tourism. It occupied a large site on Bourke Street in central Melbourne, formerly occupied by the grand Eastern Market, and was the premier hotel in the city into the early 1980s. The Southern Cross was the preferred hotel for celebrities in this period, most famously The Beatles in 1964, and the ballroom was the preferred location for locally and nationally important events.

Closed in 1995 and partly demolished, the hotel tower remained standing and vacant until its demolition in 2003.

History 

The half a city block site was occupied by the grand 1879 Eastern Market, and was owned by the City of Melbourne. Never having been successful as a food market, the structure had instead been the home of a variety of shops and entertainments, and by the 1950s it was seen as tawdry and outdated, and the Council began discussing what to do with the site.

In the 1950s, US based hotels such as Hilton and the Pan Am owned InterContinental created the first international hotel chains, bringing US-style modernity to cities around the world. With the increasing use of faster jet planes, the concept of international travel as a glamorous activity for both tourism and business purposes developed through the late 50s and early 60s.

In 1956, a vice-president of Pan Am visited Melbourne to explore the prospect of opening a hotel, and began negotiations with the Council over the Eastern Market site. A deal was eventually arranged in which a local consortium in partnership with InterContinental would build the hotel, leasing the land from the Council for 99 years, while InterContinental would provide management. In 1960, the Los Angeles architects Welton Becket & Associates, in partnership with local architects Leslie M. Perrot & Partners, were chosen, and demolition of the market commenced that year.

Billed as luxury hotel costing £5,250,000, that provided "comfort and service without equal", the completed building was opened by the Australian Prime Minister Robert Menzies on 14 August 1962, live on television.

The Southern Cross was an immediate success, attracting the growing international 'jet set', and hosting most world-famous visitors to Melbourne in the following decades such as the Beatles, Judy Garland, Rock Hudson, David Cassidy, John Wayne and Marlene Dietrich.

The hotel is best known for hosting The Beatles on the Melbourne leg of their Australian tour in 1964. 'Beatlemania' reached a fever pitch in Melbourne, and huge crowds blocked traffic outside the hotel, and fainting girls had to be treated on the street. When they left, their bed sheets were torn up and sold for charity. In Beatle lore, their stay is important since it was the only hotel to host five of the Beatles at one time. (Jimmy Nicol was hired as a temporary drummer for an ill Ringo Starr).

The Southern Cross remained the most glamorous place to stay through the 60s and 70s, and the large ballroom hosted many important events, including such nationally significant events as the Logies, the Brownlows, and Liberal Party Federal election-night functions.

In 1977, with Pam Am in debt, Intercontinental sold their stake to Australian owners, and ceased to manage the hotel. With the opening of more, large luxury hotels beginning with the Hilton in East Melbourne in 1974, then the Grand Hyatt in nearby Collins Street in 1988, and the Langham in Southbank in 1992, the Southern Cross lost its premier position. The attached shopping court had never been particularly popular and by the 1980s was considered a planning failure. In the early 1990s, having already lost many of the 'themed' rooms, another refurbishment removed more of its remaining original character, the most dramatic change being beige paint over the blue tiled exterior. 

It was sold to the Republic of Nauru in 1994, who then closed it on 1 April 1995 pending a large scale redevelopment that would have retained but reclad the hotel tower.  After a failed appeal for State heritage listing by the National Trust of Victoria, the shopping court was demolished.  However, this project never proceeded any further, and the abandoned tower stood derelict until finally being completely demolished in 2003, to make way for a new office development. It has been replaced by the large Southern Cross Tower designed by Woods Bagot.

Features 

Located on a two-and-a-quarter-acre site, the Southern Cross Hotel was a large project that included not just the hotel itself but a shopping plaza adjacent along Bourke Street, in an attempt to provide all the facilities a hotel guest might require in a single development. The 11 level tower of the 435-room hotel faced Exhibition Street, above a lobby and bars and restaurants in the fully glazed ground and first floors. The double level plaza behind covered a larger area, had a long front along Bourke Street, and was wrapped around an internal square courtyard, with a central fountain. The plaza contained more associated bars and restaurants, and another 40 or so shops, as well a bowling alley on the upper level. The Southern Cross Ballroom, with a seating capacity of 500, sat on top of the south side of the plaza building, and was accessed from the main lobby. There were a total of ten bars, restaurants and function rooms within the hotel and the plaza, and the range of shops included such necessities as a pharmacy, hairdresser, beauty parlour, tobacconists, car rental, travel agents, banks, as well as fashion boutiques and gift shops. A large 350 space carpark in the basement served both guests and public (guests could park free of charge when it first opened). The shopping plaza was designed on a broad horizontal base, setback from the marked slope of Bourke and Little Collins Streets (this created a break in the continuity of the shopfronts along Bourke Street, eventually affecting its popularity and viability).

The 435 bedrooms were double rooms available at single or double tariffs. They were decorated in seven different colour schemes, all of them modern and striking. All rooms were air-conditioned, with each guest permitted to regulate individual temperatures, as well as Radio, TV, and piped music being available in every room, all unusual features at the time. The rooms were available originally for £4 a day.

Architectural style 

The Mid-century modern style exterior was decorative and colourful, featuring a flattened hexagonal pattern on the bold horizontals of the podium of the hotel and the shopping block, zig-zag edges to the base and top of the tower block, and most strikingly, bright blue spandrel panels on the tower that used mosaic tiles in twenty-three different shades. 

A large illuminated rooftop "Southern Cross" sign was attached to the front and back of the two-storey screen wall that hid the services on the roof.

Interiors

International chain hotels built in that period around the world were often boldly Modernist, but featured art, decor or rooms with 'national' references. In the case of the Southern Cross, not only was the name a local reference, but some of the interiors reflected the still mostly Victorian-era city of Melbourne. The Mayfair Room featured cast-iron lace style filigree arched wall sections and gas-lamp style light fittings, the Coolibah Restaurant featured illuminated aboriginal-style shields and timber panelling, and at plaza level The Tavern featured ornate carved blackwood bars and room dividers with leadlight and etched glass panels like an old English pub.

Critiques

The decorative design was not well received by the architectural establishment when it opened, and by the end of its life it was widely seen as 'kitsch'. The use of 
purely decorative elements was exactly the kind of 'featurism' that influential local architect and critic Robin Boyd had consistently derided, especially in his 1960 publication The Australian Ugliness. (though he never specifically criticised the Southern Cross). Most architects in Victoria in the 50s and 60s had similar views, and the Southern Cross remained the most prominent 'featurist' building in Melbourne.

By the 1990s, the style of the hotel was widely considered to be in "bad taste."  Writing about it in the early 1990s, Architectural Historian Miles Lewis described it as "garish, featuristic, and American". However, The National Trust (Victoria) published an article in 1994 in defence of its importance, when they unsuccessfully attempted to have the building heritage listed.

Directory of Shops

Gallery

See also
 Southern Cross Tower

References

Hotels in Melbourne
Demolished buildings and structures in Melbourne
Former buildings and structures in Melbourne
Hotel buildings completed in 1962
Buildings and structures demolished in 2003
1962 establishments in Australia
1995 disestablishments in Australia
InterContinental hotels
Welton Becket buildings
International Style (architecture)
Modernist architecture in Australia
Demolished hotels in Australia